Kukohou (or Kukohoa) was High Chief of the Island of Hawaiʻi in ancient Hawaii. His title was Alii Nui — "Chief of the island". His famous descendant was King Kamehameha I.

A member of the Pili line, Kukohou was son of Loʻe and his wife, Hinamaileliʻi, and he succeeded his great-grandfather Pilikaʻaiea. Wife of Kukohou was his half-sister Hineuki (Hina-keʻuki). Their son was named Kaniuhu, and he ruled after Kukohouʻs death.

References

Bibliography
Abraham Fornander. An Account of the Polynesian Race: Its Origin and Migrations. Charles E. Tuttle Company. 1969. 
David Malo. Hawaiian Antiquities. Bishop Museum Press. 1951.
House of Pili
Hawaiian chiefs